SkyChase is a combat flight simulator designed by Ralph Russell in 1988. It is the first game developed by Maxis.

Gameplay
SkyChase is an arcadey combat flight simulator often compared to Top Gun by Ocean Software.

Reception

Julian Rignall of Computer and Video Games compared the game negatively to other flight simulators of the time: "Although Sky Chase has an impressive front end, the game itself is very simplistic, and plays similarly to Ocean's failed Top Gun Licence; it pales in comparison with Cascade's Ace II. There's little difference between the planes, and the gameplay is very repetitive."

Gary Whitta of Commodore User summarized: "[...] I would only advise you to consider buying Skychase if you have a chum to play it with. The computer mode is boring, too easy, and ultimately a drag to play."

Zzap!64 concluded that the game is "An exhilarating flying game - at its best with two players at the controls."

References

External links

SkyChase at the Hall of Light
SkyChase at Atari Mania

1988 video games
Amiga games
Atari ST games
Broderbund games
Combat flight simulators
DOS games
Image Works games
Maxis games
Multiplayer and single-player video games
Video games developed in the United States